An animal with the conservation status of lower risk is one with populations levels high enough to ensure its survival. Animals with this status do not qualify as being threatened or extinct, however, natural disasters or certain human activities would cause them to change to either of these classifications.

This classification is sub-divided into three types:
Conservation dependent - where cessation of current conservation measures may result in it being classified at a higher risk level.
Near threatened - may become vulnerable to endangerment in the near future but not meeting the criteria.
Least concern - where neither of the two above apply.

See also
Biodiversity action plan
Endangered species

References
 

Conservation biology